The Pleasanton Fairgrounds Racetrack at the Alameda County Fairgrounds in Pleasanton, California is a one-mile (1.6 km / 8-f) race track for Thoroughbred, Quarter horse and Arabian racing. Constructed in 1858 by the sons of Spaniard Don Agustín Bernal, it is the third-oldest horse racing track of its kind in the United States. Only the Freehold Raceway in New Jersey (oldest) and Fair Grounds Race Course in Louisiana are older.

Known as the Pleasanton Trotting Park in 1876, Joseph Nevis inherited the track and took over the racetrack and built its first grandstand. In 1883, Australian millionaire Monroe Salisbury bought it for $25,000 (about 666,325 when adjusted for inflation), and renamed it the Pleasanton Stock Farm. His signature red hay gained fame for the racetrack, and Eastern United States owners began shipping their horses to Pleasanton. 

In 1900, H.F Anderson bought the racetrack, renaming it the Pleasanton Training Track, and improved it with the extension of the racetrack, and the addition of 200 stalls.

The racetrack eventually became associated with the Alameda County Fair with the first fair being held on the grounds of the racetrack in 1912.

The racetrack would again change hands in 1911, when the Canadian Roger J. MacKenzie bought it and renovated it by adding living quarters and an additional barn to accommodate extra horses. Due to the racetrack's reliance on betting to stay afloat and the brief outlawing of it for 20 years, the racetrack would be closed for 16 years from 1916-1932.

In 1940, the facility was sold to Alameda County.

In years past, during the winter months wealthy owners in the Eastern United States often shipped their horses to Pleasanton for training.

Notable races run annually at Pleasanton include:
 California Wine Stakes
 Livermore Valley Wine Stakes
 Alameda County Fillies & Mares
 Alamedan Handicap
 Sam J. Whiting Memorial Handicap
 Juan Gonzalez Memorial Stakes
 Everett Nevin Alameda County Overnight Stakes

References

External links 
 1960 aerial photograph of Pleasanton Fairgrounds Racetrack
 Cartography Associates - 1878 image of Pleasanton Racetrack

Horse racing venues in California
Pleasanton, California
Sports venues in Alameda County, California
1858 establishments in California
Sports venues completed in 1858